Kfar Giladi (lit. Giladi Village) is a kibbutz in the Galilee Panhandle of northern Israel. Located south of Metula on the Naftali Mountains above the Hula Valley and along the Lebanese border, it falls under the jurisdiction of Upper Galilee Regional Council.

History
Kibbutz Giladi was founded in 1916 by members of Hashomer on land owned by the Jewish Colonization Association. It was named after Israel Giladi, one of the founders of the Hashomer movement. The area was subject to intermittent border adjustments between the British and the French, and in 1919, the British relinquished the northern section of the Upper Galilee containing Tel Hai, Metula, Hamra, and Kfar Giladi to the French jurisdiction. After the Arab attack on Tel Hai in 1920, it was temporarily abandoned. Ten months later, the settlers returned. Several older buildings stand on the kibbutz that memorialize previous battles on the site, before and during the 1948 Arab–Israeli War.

Between 1916 and 1932, the population totaled 40–70. In 1932, the kibbutz absorbed 100 newcomers, mainly young immigrants. From 1922 to 1948, between 8,000–10,000 Jewish immigrants were smuggled into Palestine through Kibbutz Giladi, circumventing the Mandatory ban on Jewish immigration. The immigrants came from Syria, Lebanon, Turkey, Iraq, Afghanistan and Eastern Europe.

In an operation known as Mivtzah HaElef, 1,300 Jewish children were smuggled out of Syria between 1945 and 1948. At the kibbutz, the children were dressed in work clothes and hidden in the kibbutz chicken coops and cowsheds.

In August 2006, during the 2006 Lebanon War, twelve reserve IDF soldiers were killed after being hit by a Katyusha rocket launched by Hezbollah from Southern Lebanon. The group of artillery gunners were gathering on the kibbutz in preparation for action in the conflict.

Economy

The economy of Kfar Giladi is based on agriculture, a quarry, nurseries, an eyewear factory (Galilee Optics, which closed in 2005) and a hotel. The kibbutz grows apples and avocados, utilizing volunteers to help pick fruit during the harvest. Other crops include lychees, corn, cotton, wheat and potatoes. The kibbutz also raises chickens and dairy cows, and operates fish ponds.

Landmarks
Eight historic buildings built in 1922 are being preserved and restored. Built of Galilee stone and materials imported from Lebanon, they are among the few remaining vestiges of early kibbutz housing.

Archaeology
An archaeological site at Kfar Giladi was excavated in 1957 and 1962. It revealed remains four stages of occupation in different periods. An early neolithic stage was suggested to date between 6400 and 5800 BC. Finds included Dark faced burnished ware with incisions and rope patterns. Flints included axes, adzes, arrowheads and denticulated sickle blade elements. Similar finds were located in a later neolithic stage including a female clay figurine dating between 5800 and 5400 BC. Two later periods of occupation were attributed to chalcolithic occupations similar to Wadi Rabah.

Another nearby neolithic site was excavated in 1973. They found Byblos points and tips of Jericho points and Amuq points, polished cutting axes, chisels and fine-toothed sickles. Finds were similar to Tell Ramad.

See also
Keeping the Kibbutz (2010 documentary about Kfar Giladi)

References

External links

Official website 
Kfar Giladi Jewish Agency for Israel
Atlas des sites Prochaine-Orient 14000 et 5700 BP - MOM's online application - Atlas of Near East Archaeological Sites 14000 to 5700 BP
Facebook group for former volunteers and for kibbutzniks
movie taken in the 1930s

Kibbutzim
Kibbutz Movement
Populated places established in 1916
1916 establishments in Ottoman Syria
Archaeological sites in Israel
Populated places in Northern District (Israel)